Carlos Montilla (born 21 August 1962) is a Venezuelan television and theater actor known for his roles in various telenovelas and theater productions.

Biography
He was born to Reina Isabel and Teófilo and is the second of three brothers.

Carlos began his academic studies in the United States after obtaining an academic scholarship to study at the Pacific Lutheran University in Washington. While there, he enrolled in an acting class and developed an interest in acting. He returned to Venezuela to enroll in drama school. During this time, he attended various acting workshops with renowned actors where his interest in acting grew.

Montilla is also a singer with his first album titled De ahora en adelante. The first single from the album, "Loba Herida", was the main theme of the telenovela La loba herida in which he had a starring role. The album was certified gold in Spain. Montilla currently lives in Los Angeles, California.

Telenovelas
 Topacio (1984) as Rafaelote
 Alma mía (1988) as Luis Gustavo
 Primavera (1988) as Salvador
 Rubí rebelde (1989) as Diego
 Carmen Querida (1990) as Arturo
 La loba herida (1992) as Macuto Algarbe
 Sirena (1993) as Adonis Diniz
 Aunque me Cueste la Vida (1998) as Vicente
 Mariú (2000) as Emiliano Galvez
 Carissima (2001) as Gabriel Santuario
 Trapos íntimos (2002) as Fernando Lobo Santacruz
 El amor las vuelve locas (2005) as Pablo Martinez
 Ciudad Bendita (2006) as Darwin Manuel
 La vida entera (2008) as Cristóbal Duque
 Tomasa Tequiero (2009) as Severo Bustamante
 El Fantasma de Elena (2010) as Darío Girón
 Mi ex me tiene ganas (2012) as Kevin Miller

Films 

 La Magica Aventura de Oscar (2000)
 The Boatman (2015) as Norberto
 Samland (2022) as JJ

TV SERIES 

 The Sentinel ( 1 episode)
 Jane The virgen ( 2016)

Discography
 De ahora en adelante (1992)

References

External links
 

1965 births
Living people
Venezuelan male telenovela actors
People from Caracas